Aemakazi is a village in Jalandhar. Jalandhar is a district in the Indian state of Punjab.

About 
Aemakazi lies on the Kartarpur-Kala Bakra road.  The nearest railway station to Aemakazi is Kala Bakra railway station at a distance of 8 km.

Post code 
Aemakazi's post office is Mustafapur whose post code is 144801.

References 

  A Punjabi site with Aemakazi's details

Villages in Jalandhar district